The Vocational Competence Certificate (VCC) is a system of professional certification. It is headquartered in Lublin, Poland.

The VCC ideas are in accordance with strategic documents and directives in the European Union within the vocational range of education: 
 Initiation “New abilities on new work posts” - education and training customized to labour market needs and an access to education during the whole professional life,
 The European Credit System for Vocational Education,
 The CELAN system - aimed at promoting foreign languages,
 Strategy Europe 2020,
 The European Professional Card – implemented by the European Commission to give employees the same rights in all European Union Countries,
 The European Qualifications Framework.

The VCC is divided into two areas:  New Competences and Select Competences.

New Competences - The VCC New Competences module provides an opportunity to practise a certain profession. the recommended vocational education pathway within the VCC New Competences module includes between 260 and 300 training hours. To obtain a VCC New Competence certificate you need to pass 2 exams to demonstrate your theoretical and practical knowledge and abilities in the given profession.  The VCC is innovative thanks to the psychological and IT elements involved in the modules, as well as the trade foreign language course on offer.

Select Competences - The VCC Select Competences module provides candidates with an opportunity to develop update and independently choose their own modules. The VCC certification system is based on the results of the education process, meaning that every person, regardless of time, place, or education can pass a VCC exam in accordance of the European Qualifications Framework.

The VCC structure involves the following: 
 The VCC Foundation – responsible for the framework of the VCC modules and indicates the directions of its development,
 The Regional Academy – responsible for the certification process in a particular country/region,
 The Academy of Education – responsible for the education process
 Examination Partners – responsible for the organization of the theoretical and practical exams,
 Supporting Partners – responsible for promoting the VCC standard in its activities.

The separation between the education process and education results, as found in the VCC structure, is in accordance with the ISO17000-024.

References

External links 
 

Qualifications
Educational policies and initiatives of the European Union
Vocational education in Poland